Homalopoma maculatum is a species of small sea snail with calcareous opercula, a marine gastropod mollusk in the family Colloniidae.

Description
The shell grows to a size of 3 mm.

Distribution
This species occurs in the Pacific Ocean off the Kurile Islands.

References

External links
 To Encyclopedia of Life
 To World Register of Marine Species

Colloniidae
Gastropods described in 1978